The Lisbon Inn, formerly The Moulton, is a historic former hotel building on United States Route 302 in Lisbon, New Hampshire.  Located at the southern end of Lisbon's central business district, the 1901 three story wood-frame building is an imposing presence, with Queen Anne-style pyramidal roof turrets at the corners of the main facade.  The front of the building has two stories of porches with Colonial Revival styling.

The building was listed on the National Register of Historic Places in 1980 for architecture as its area of significance.

History of the site
The Lisbon Inn is built on the site of Brigham's Hotel, which was destroyed in the Great Fire of 1901. The fire started in a peg mill owned by James G. Moore on November 3, 1901, and it destroyed most of Lisbon's business district.

Herbert Moulton purchased the site for $10,000 and rebuilt a hotel after the fire of 1901. The new hotel was named "The Moulton", and opened in 1903. Several years later, Moulton sold the hotel to Edwin Morse. The hotel was lost to fire again in 1922 and rebuilt by Ralph Olney who built it up to become one of the most prominent small hotels in New Hampshire.

Statement of significance

See also
National Register of Historic Places listings in Grafton County, New Hampshire

References

Hotel buildings on the National Register of Historic Places in New Hampshire
Queen Anne architecture in New Hampshire
Hotel buildings completed in 1901
Buildings and structures in Grafton County, New Hampshire
National Register of Historic Places in Grafton County, New Hampshire